This is a list of defunct airlines of Thailand.

See also
 List of airlines of Thailand
 List of airports in Thailand

References

Thailand
Airlines
Airlines, defunct